Job Vissers (born 15 November 1984) is a Dutch cyclist.

Palmares
2007
1st stage 1 Ronde van Midden-Brabant
2008
1st Omloop der Kempen
1st Omloop van de Hoekse Waard
2010
1st Ronde van Overijssel

References

1984 births
Living people
Dutch male cyclists
People from Veghel
Cyclists from North Brabant
20th-century Dutch people
21st-century Dutch people